Sandhurst Town Football Club is a semi-professional football club based in Sandhurst, Berkshire, England. Formed in 1910, the club plays at their temporary home ground sharing with Bracknell Town.

History
After the club's formation in 1910, Sandhurst played in the Reading & District League consistently up to 1979 other than a short spell in the East Berkshire Football League. In 1979, the club was then elected into the Aldershot & District League in which they finished in third place in their first season. In 1984 Sandhurst Town F.C. finished as runners-up from whence whey became founder members of the Chiltonian League and a stepping stone toward becoming a senior club. Their most successful season in the Chiltonian Football League was in 1986–87 when they finished in second place. In 1990, the club applied for membership of the Combined Counties League and were accepted after being granted senior status by the Berks & Bucks County FA. The first two seasons were poor as they finished in bottom place on each occasion and avoided relegation back to the Chiltonian Football League at the end of the second season only due to the vacancy created by the departure of Steyning Town to the Sussex County League. However, the form of the club improved thereafter with appointment as player-manager of Tony O'Connor, who brought an improvement in the quality and stature of the team. During his second season of management, the club reached the final of the Berks & Bucks Senior Trophy, where they lost 0–1 to Eton Wick, and the final of the League Challenge Vase, losing 1–2 to Bedfont. In 1996, Tony O'Connor gave up his position as manager, although he remained at the club as a player. Since then, several managers have managed the club with differing degrees of success.  The current manager is Dean Thomas, who took over from Jon Underwood in October 2010.

Upon finishing 7th in the 2010/11 league season, the Fizzers went on to beat Wembley F.C. 1–0 at Farnborough Town Football Stadium on 6 May 2011 in the EL Records Premier Challenge Cup. This was the first time Sandhurst had won this honour and did so without conceding a single goal throughout the tournament – due to a solid back four defence.

Stadium
Sandhurst Town play their home games at Bottom Meadow, Sandhurst Memorial Park, Yorktown Road, Sandhurst, Berkshire, GU47 9BJ.

The first ground used by the club was a field adjacent to the Bull & Butcher Public House, which was used as the club headquarters. After a few years, a move was made to the Memorial Park where the club remained until the 1996 close season apart from a couple of seasons during the 1950s spent on a nearby pitch in St John's Road. The introduction of the National Lottery prompted an immediate bid for funding to build a new ground in Bottom Meadow adjacent to the Memorial Park. With support and backing through additional match funding from Bracknell Forest Borough Council and Sandhurst Town Council, the club were successful in the first round of allocation ever made by the National Lotteries Charities Board.

The new facilities opened in August 1997 at a cost of £265,000. The ground is totally enclosed with perimeter fence and contains a boardroom/changing rooms complex, floodlights, covered accommodation, hardstanding and a post and rail barrier around the pitch. The new pitch was laid some eighteen months previously, following guidance from the national Sports Turf Council, but did not stage its first match until the start of the 1997–98 season. The ground and facilities at Bottom Meadow have been designed to meet the highest grading level of the Isthmian League to enable the club to make further progress in the football pyramid structure when circumstances permit. How far this progression has reached can be determined by the inclusion of the Club into the FA Cup for season 1998–99. The attendance record at the ground was set on 17 August 2002, when 2,449 watched Sandhurst Town's league match against AFC Wimbledon.

The club were first accepted for entry in to the FA Cup in 1998–99, with their best run in the competition to date being reaching the Second Round Qualifying in 2004–05. In the FA Vase, their most successful season was also 2004–05, when they reached the Third Round (last 64) before losing.

In 2005 a small all-seater covered stand was incorporated into the ground. This consists of 108 seats, in the red and black colours of the club.

Season-by-season record since 2000

Nickname
The club gives two explanations of its unusual nickname of 'The Fizzers', and it is unclear if the two are related.  One explanation states that it derives from a Friendly Insurance Society (F.I.S.) set up in Sandhurst in 1933. The club alternatively state that the nickname originates from their supporters standing behind an opposing team's goal and shouting "Fizz Fizz Bang!" when the ball went into the net, although no explanation is given for why they would have done so.

Honours
EL Records Premier Challenge Cup
Winners 2010–11
Yateley & District Hospital Cup
Winners 1925–1926, 1926–1927, 1971–1972, 1983–1984
Aldershot FA Senior Cup
Winners 2000–2001 & 2005–06
Southern Combination Cup
Winners 2002–2003
Reading & District League
Premier Division Winners 1933–1934
Division 1 Winners 1932–1933
Aldershot & District League
Division 1 Winners 1980–1981
Division 1 Cup Winners 1980–1981
Eric Perrin Silver Plate Winners 1997–1998
Ascot & District Charity Cup
Winners 1933–1934, 1986–1987, 1987–1988
Fripp-Smith Trophy
Winners 2021

Records
Bottom Meadow Ground attendance record
2,449 v AFC Wimbledon 17 August 2002
Biggest victory
9–1 v Cranleigh 8 January 2000
Heaviest defeat
0–8 v Cobham 26 October 1991
Best FA Cup run
2004–05 2nd Qualifying Round v Leatherhead Lost 2–0
Best FA Vase run
2004–05 3rd Round Proper v AFC Newbury Lost 3–0

Management team 
Manager - Jordan Ive
Assistant Manager -

References

External links

Football clubs in Berkshire
Association football clubs established in 1910
Combined Counties Football League
Hellenic Football League
Sandhurst, Berkshire
1910 establishments in England
Football clubs in England